The Battle of Delft was a naval battle 
on December 25, 2007 and part of the Sri Lankan Civil War. The Sri Lankan Navy claimed that it received reports of a boat cluster moving off of Delft Island.  After moving in to investigate clashes erupted and fierce sea battle ensued. Both sides claimed to have victory. The pro-rebel Tamilnet claimed that the Sea Tigers sank one Sri Lankan Navy vessel and the Sri Lankan Navy suffered casualty. However, the Sri Lankan Defense ministry claimed that 6 Tiger boats were sunk and over 40 Tigers were killed.

References

External links

Battles of Eelam War IV
Conflicts in 2007
Naval battles involving Sri Lanka
December 2007 events in Asia
2007 in Sri Lanka

Battles in 2007